State Route 1 (SR 1) is a major north–south state highway that runs along most of the Pacific coastline of the U.S. state of California. At , it is the longest state route in California, and the second-longest in the US after Montana Highway 200. SR 1 has several portions designated as either Pacific Coast Highway (PCH), Cabrillo Highway, Shoreline Highway, or Coast Highway. Its southern terminus is at Interstate 5 (I-5) near Dana Point in Orange County and its northern terminus is at U.S. Route 101 (US 101) near Leggett in Mendocino County. SR 1 also at times runs concurrently with US 101, most notably through a  stretch in Ventura and Santa Barbara counties, and across the Golden Gate Bridge.

The highway is designated as an All-American Road. In addition to providing a scenic route to numerous attractions along the coast, the route also serves as a major thoroughfare in the Greater Los Angeles Area, the San Francisco Bay Area, and several other coastal urban areas.

SR 1 was built piecemeal in various stages, with the first section opening in the Big Sur region in the 1930s. However, portions of the route had several names and numbers over the years as more segments opened. It was not until the 1964 state highway renumbering that the entire route was officially designated as SR 1. Although SR 1 is a popular route for its scenic beauty, frequent landslides and erosion along the coast have caused several segments to be either closed for lengthy periods for repairs, or re-routed inland.

Route description 
SR 1 is part of the California Freeway and Expressway System, and through the Los Angeles metro area, Monterey, Santa Cruz, and San Francisco metro area is part of the National Highway System, a network of highways that are considered essential to the country's economy, defense, and mobility by the Federal Highway Administration. The California State Legislature has also relinquished state control of segments within Dana Point, Newport Beach, Santa Monica, and Oxnard; those segments are now maintained by those respective municipalities.

The Big Sur section from San Luis Obispo to Carmel is an official National Scenic Byway. SR 1 is eligible to be included in the State Scenic Highway System; however, only a few stretches between Los Angeles and San Francisco have officially been designated as a scenic highway, meaning that there are substantial sections of highway passing through a "memorable landscape" with no "visual intrusions", where the potential designation has gained popular favor with the community.

The entire route is designated as a Blue Star Memorial Highway to recognize those in the United States armed forces; this designation is sponsored by the California Garden Clubs, but the organization has not erected such markers along SR 1 yet. In 1959, the legislature officially designated the segment in Southern California between Interstate 5 (I-5) in Dana Point and US 101 near Oxnard as the Pacific Coast Highway (commonly referred to as "PCH", without the definite article "the", unlike other freeway numbers in the Los Angeles area). Between US 101 at the Las Cruces junction ( south of Buellton) and US 101 in Pismo Beach, and between US 101 in San Luis Obispo and Interstate 280 in San Francisco, the legislature also designated SR 1 as the Cabrillo Highway in 1959, after the explorer Juan Rodríguez Cabrillo who sailed along the coast line. The legislature also designated the route as the Shoreline Highway in 1957 between the Manzanita Junction near Marin City and Leggett. Smaller segments of the highway have been assigned several other names by the state and municipal governments.

For the most part, SR 1 runs parallel to the coastline, or close to it, but does turn several miles inland at various locations to avoid several federally controlled or protected areas such as Vandenberg Space Force Base, Diablo Canyon Power Plant and Point Reyes National Seashore. In addition to connecting the coastal cities and communities along its path, the route provides access to beaches, parks, and other attractions along the coast, making it a popular route for tourists. The route annually helps bring several billion dollars to the state's tourism industry. Segments of SR 1 range from urban freeway to simple rural two-lane road. Under the California Coastal Act, those segments of the highway that run through the rural areas of the protected California Coastal Zone may not be widened beyond a scenic two-lane road.

Orange County

At its southernmost end in Orange County, SR 1 terminates at I-5 in Capistrano Beach in Dana Point. It then travels west into the city center. After leaving Dana Point, Pacific Coast Highway (PCH) becomes simply "Coast Highway" while at the same time continuing northwest along the coast through Laguna Beach (where it meets the southern terminus of SR 133) and Crystal Cove State Park.

SR 1 then enters Newport Beach and passes through several affluent neighborhoods, including Newport Coast and Corona Del Mar, spans the entrance to the Upper Newport Bay, which marks the boundary between East Coast Highway and West Coast Highway, and crosses California State Route 55 near its southern terminus. Upon crossing the Santa Ana River mouth and entering Huntington Beach, SR 1 regains the Pacific Coast Highway designation. It passes Huntington State Beach and the southern terminus of California State Route 39 before reaching Bolsa Chica State Beach and the Bolsa Chica Ecological Reserve. PCH then continues along the coast into Seal Beach, the final city on its journey in Orange County.

Los Angeles and Ventura counties

PCH enters Los Angeles County and the city of Long Beach after crossing the San Gabriel River. From the traffic circle, it continues inland west through Long Beach, including approximately one mile adjacent to the southern boundary of Signal Hill. PCH is marked as such in Long Beach, but originally bore the name of Hathaway Avenue east of the traffic circle and State Street west of there. PCH then passes through the Los Angeles districts of Wilmington and Harbor City. While bypassing the immediate coastline of Palos Verdes, SR 1 continues to head west into the cities of Lomita and Torrance along the route of the former Redondo-Wilmington Boulevard.

PCH then turns north through Redondo Beach and Hermosa Beach. Upon entering Manhattan Beach, it becomes Sepulveda Boulevard and turns back into PCH designation through El Segundo. At Imperial Highway, it regains the name Sepulveda Boulevard as it descends and passes under two runways of Los Angeles International Airport (LAX) via the Sepulveda Boulevard Tunnel.

After leaving LAX, SR 1 splits from Sepulveda and turns northwest, becoming Lincoln Boulevard and passing through the Los Angeles neighborhoods of Westchester, Playa Vista, and Venice, as well as the unincorporated community of Marina Del Rey. This portion of SR 1 suffers heavy congestion at most times due to the shortage of alternate north-south arterial roads west of Interstate 405.  It then enters the city of Santa Monica, where SR 1 turns southwest, merging onto the westernmost segment of the Santa Monica Freeway. Passing through the McClure Tunnel (which also serves as the national western terminus of Interstate 10), SR 1 emerges along the beachfront in Santa Monica as PCH again and continues along the coast, separated from Downtown Santa Monica by the palisades north of Santa Monica Pier; this portion is also known locally as Palisades Beach Road and formerly as Roosevelt Highway. Upon leaving Santa Monica, PCH continues to follow the coast, curving west through the Pacific Palisades neighborhood of Los Angeles before becoming the main thoroughfare of the city of Malibu while traversing the entire  of that city.

SR 1 crosses the county line and continues through the Ventura County portion of the Malibu coast through Leo Carrillo State Park and Point Mugu State Park. After passing through a notch in the promontory that marks Point Mugu, the western end of the Santa Monica Mountains, and the beginning of the Oxnard Plain. The road cut left a very large rock formation at the tip of the point that is called the Mugu Rock. At that point, PCH leaves the coast and heads north, and then northwest as a freeway along the northeastern boundary of Naval Base Ventura County Point Mugu for several miles to an interchange at Rice Avenue, Pleasant Valley Road, and Oxnard Boulevard in Oxnard. The reconstructed interchange at Rice Avenue and Pleasant Valley Road channels traffic north on the surface street, Rice Avenue, towards the interchange with US 101. The historic route along Oxnard Boulevard was relinquished in 2014. Truck traffic to and from the Port of Hueneme also uses this designated route at the Rice Avenue/Hueneme Road connector to connect with Route 101 at the Rice Avenue Interchange.

Central Coast
The route then turns away from the coast at Gaviota, avoiding Point Conception, and heads due north through Gaviota State Park and the Gaviota Tunnel. In Las Cruces, SR 1, now named Cabrillo Highway, splits again from US 101 and heads northwest to the city of Lompoc. It is briefly joined with SR 246 along Lompoc's east-west Ocean Avenue, before turning north as H Street to Harris Grade Road, where it then regains the Cabrillo Highway name.

After reaching the main entrance to Vandenberg Space Force Base, SR 1 turns northeast, away from the immediate coastline of the base, to join SR 135. Route 135 then splits from Route 1 south of Orcutt, and the Cabrillo Highway turns northwest back towards the coast to Guadalupe. It enters San Luis Obispo County, avoiding the immediate coastline of the protected Guadalupe-Nipomo Dunes, before passing through Grover Beach and subsequently joining US 101 for the third time at Pismo Beach. The US 101/SR 1 concurrency then avoids the immediate coastline of Avila Beach and Diablo Canyon Power Plant, and instead heads straight inland to San Luis Obispo.

SR 1 splits from US 101 at Santa Rosa Street in San Luis Obispo and then resumes as a four lane road as the Cabrillo Highway. It rejoins the coast in Morro Bay, running through that city as a freeway, where it crosses Morro Creek at the site of a prehistoric Chumash settlement dating to the Millingstone Horizon. From there, SR 1 proceeds north to Cayucos until it again becomes a winding, two lane road with occasional passing lanes. It then continues along the coast through Cambria and San Simeon, and past the elephant seal colony at Piedras Blancas Light Station. SR 1 provides access to Hearst Castle in San Simeon in Northern San Luis Obispo County.

Big Sur
 

SR 1 then enters the Big Sur region, crossing San Carpóforo Creek just south of the Monterey County line. The road briefly leaves the coast for a few miles, passing through a redwood forest in the Big Sur River valley. The Big Sur segment of the highway, built between 1919 and 1937, also crosses a number of now historic bridges, including the scenic Bixby Creek Bridge, a reinforced concrete arch with a  span that passes over the Bixby Creek gorge, the Rocky Creek Bridge, and the Big Creek Bridge.

Monterey Bay Area
After crossing the Carmel River, SR 1 turns inland and runs along the eastern boundary of Carmel and the western boundary of Carmel Valley before becoming a freeway in Monterey. After bypassing the immediate coastline of Pebble Beach and the rest of the Monterey Peninsula, the freeway heads north along the coast of Monterey Bay through Sand City, Seaside, and Marina. At the interchange with SR 156 near Castroville, SR 1 continues north as a two-lane rural road to Moss Landing.

SR 1 becomes a freeway once again just before entering into Santa Cruz County. This four-lane freeway continues up the Monterey Bay coast through Watsonville to its interchange with SR 17 in Santa Cruz. (This trumpet interchange is locally known as The Fishhook due to its tight loop ramps that resemble a fishhook when viewed from above). After a short expressway section, it skirts downtown Santa Cruz as four-lane Mission Street, regaining the Cabrillo Highway designation (local/historic name is "Coast Road") after it leaves the city and continues north-west as a two-lane road (with occasional four-lane sections) up the coast through Davenport.

San Francisco Bay Area

Entering San Mateo County, SR 1 follows the west coast of the San Francisco Peninsula, passing by the marine mammal colonies at Año Nuevo State Park, and the historic Pigeon Point Lighthouse, before reaching Half Moon Bay. Between Half Moon Bay and Pacifica, the highway bypasses a treacherous stretch known as Devil's Slide via the Tom Lantos Tunnels.

SR 1 then becomes a freeway once again at Sharp Park in Pacifica before turning inland to join Interstate 280 in Daly City. Just short of reaching the City and County of San Francisco, SR 1 splits from Interstate 280, where the road becomes Junipero Serra Boulevard. Shortly thereafter, the highway makes a slight left, becoming the six-lane wide 19th Avenue; the San Francisco Municipal Railway's M Ocean View streetcar line runs in the median from this point until a junction to a rail only right-of-way near Rossmoor Drive. SR 1 then turns into Park Presidio Boulevard after it passes through the city's Golden Gate Park. Then after entering the Presidio of San Francisco, it goes through the MacArthur Tunnel before joining US 101 for a fourth time on the approach to the Golden Gate Bridge known as Doyle Drive.

After crossing the bridge and entering Marin County, SR 1 then splits from US 101 again near Marin City, where it leaves the city and, as the Shoreline Highway, returns to a winding, two lane road as it passes over the Marin Hills to rejoin the coast at Muir Beach. After passing Stinson Beach and the Bolinas Lagoon, SR 1 avoids the immediate coastline of Point Reyes National Seashore and the rest of the Point Reyes Peninsula, and instead heads towards, and then along, the eastern shore of Tomales Bay.

Leaving Tomales Bay, SR 1 heads further inland to intersect with Valley Ford Road just north of the Sonoma County border. It then rejoins the coast in Bodega Bay, where its name changes to Coast Highway past the Sonoma Coast State Beaches. After bridging the Russian River at Jenner, SR 1 continues to wind along the rugged coast to Fort Ross, Salt Point State Parks, and the planned community of Sea Ranch.

Mendocino County

SR 1 then crosses the Gualala River and enters Mendocino County. The highway enters the city of Point Arena, in which it becomes Main Street, before following School Street to the northwest and then becoming Shoreline Highway once again. It bridges the Garcia River and then, near Elk, the Navarro River, where it meets SR 128.

At the town of Albion, the Albion River is spanned by the Albion River Bridge, the only remaining wooden trestle bridge on the highway. SR 1 then passes through Little River and Van Damme State Park, crosses Big River and passes through Mendocino Headlands State Park and the Victorian community of Mendocino. Continuing north, SR 1 crosses Russian Gulch State Park on the Frederick W. Panhorst Bridge, and passes through the town of Caspar. It passes through a roundabout just south of the intersection with the western terminus of SR 20, where it widens to two lanes, then bridges the Noyo River at Noyo, becomes Main Street of Fort Bragg, and crosses the California Western Railroad.

North of Fort Bragg as a two-lane highway again, SR 1 passes MacKerricher State Park and the towns of Cleone and Inglenook before crossing Ten Mile River. After passing Westport-Union Landing State Beach, the road goes through a series of redwood-forested switchbacks before reaching Rockport. North of Rockport, the highway turns away from the Lost Coast to avoid steep and unstable highlands created by Mendocino Triple Junction uplift. The highway follows Cottaneva Creek inland through redwood-forested mountainous terrain before terminating at US 101 just outside Leggett.

History
SR 1 has become famous worldwide, but the highway was signed as several other routes prior to 1964. When the road was first envisioned in the World War I era, California highways were referred to by either a highway name or a route number. The route numbers were used by state highway planners and the Legislature from 1915 until 1964, but were never posted on highways, referred to by the auto clubs or public, nor used on maps. The SR 1 designation was first assigned in 1939. Various portions of SR 1 have been posted and referred to by various names and numbers over the years. State construction of what became SR 1 started after the state's third highway bond issue passed before 1910.

Segments initially constructed

Eager for a direct coastal route between Ventura and Santa Barbara, civic boosters used locally raised funds to begin building the Rincon Sea Level Road in 1911. The route between the Ventura River and Carpinteria had been an unimproved route along small alluvial fan beaches that skirted coastal bluff rock outcroppings at low tide. Construction of the Southern Pacific Coast Line railroad had created a road flanked by riprap along this area. In order to make this part of the first coastal route for motorists driving from San Francisco to Los Angeles, they paved the road and built wooden causeways where the route flooded from the ocean waves. Local funding ran out, but the newly formed State Highway Commission took over and completed the road in 1913.

One of the most difficult routes to build was along the Big Sur coast. The state first approved building Route 56, or the Carmel-San Simeon Highway, to connect Big Sur to the rest of California in 1919. Federal funds were appropriated and in 1921 voters approved additional state funds. San Quentin State Prison set up three temporary prison camps to provide unskilled convict labor to help with road construction. One was set up by Little Sur River, one at Kirk Creek and a third was later established in the south at Anderson Creek. Inmates were paid 35 cents per day and had their prison sentences reduced in return. The route necessitated construction of 33 bridges, the largest of which was the Bixby Creek Bridge. Six more concrete arch bridges were built between Point Sur and Carmel.

After 18 years of construction, aided by New Deal funds during the Great Depression, the paved two-lane road was completed and opened on June 17, 1937. The road was initially called the Carmel-San Simeon Highway (Route 56), but was better known as the Roosevelt Highway, honoring the current President Franklin D. Roosevelt. A 1921 law extended Route 56 south over the county road to Cambria.

Route 60, from Oxnard via the coast to San Juan Capistrano, was extended from Oxnard to El Rio (midway to Ventura, now the site of the Oxnard Boulevard interchange with US 101), in 1925. At Point Mugu, a path for the highway was cut through the mountains using surplus World War I explosives, thus creating Mugu Rock. The 1921 legislation, in theory, made Route 60 a continuous coastal loop, with both ends at what became US 101 in Oxnard and at Capistrano Beach (since 1964 the southern terminus of SR 1 at Interstate 5 in Orange County). Route 56 was extended further south from Cambria to connect to present-day US 101 in San Luis Obispo in 1931.

The route from San Simeon to Carmel (connecting with existing county highways at each end) was one of two sections designated as SR 1. It and Route 60 were intended as links in a continuous coastal roadway from Oregon to Mexico,

A large expansion of the state highway system in 1933 resulted in Route 56 being extended in both directions. To the south, a second section was added, beginning at Pismo Beach on US 101 (Route 2) and heading south through Guadalupe and Lompoc to rejoin US 101 at a junction called Los Cruces (sic), just north of Gaviota Pass. (A short piece near Orcutt and Los Alamos had been part of Route 2, which originally followed present SR 135 from Los Alamos to Santa Maria.) To the north, Route 56 was continued along the coast from Carmel through Santa Cruz to San Francisco. Several discontinuous pieces were added north of San Francisco, one from Route 1 (US 101) north of the Golden Gate to the county line near Valley Ford, another from the Russian River near Jenner (where the new Route 104 ended) to Westport, and a third from Ferndale to Route 1 near Fernbridge. Except for the gaps in Route 56 north of San Francisco, these additions completed the coastal highway, with other sections formed by Routes 1, 2, and 71.

The section of SR 1 from Santa Monica to Oxnard, via Malibu, went out to contract in 1925 as "Coast Boulevard", but was designated "Theodore Roosevelt Highway" when it was dedicated in 1929. Before the completion of its present alignment in 1937, a narrow, winding, steep road known as Pedro Mountain Road connected Montara with Pacifica. That highway was completed in 1914 and provided competition to the Ocean Shore Railroad, which operated between San Francisco and Tunitas Creek from 1907 to 1920. SR 1 also used to run along the coast between Pacifica and Daly City, but this segment was damaged and rendered unusable after a 5.3 magnitude earthquake on March 22, 1957. A small stub remains near Thornton Beach.

Route 56 along Big Sur was incorporated into the state highway system and re-designated as SR 1 in 1939. The section of road along the Big Sur Coast was declared the first State Scenic Highway in 1965, and in 1966 the first lady, Mrs. Lyndon B. Johnson, led the official designation ceremony at Bixby Creek Bridge. The route was designated as an All American Road by the US Government.

Signs first posted

SR 1 signs first went up after California decided to number its highways, in 1934. The section for Humboldt, Mendocino, Sonoma, Marin, San Francisco, San Mateo, Santa Cruz, Monterey, San Luis Obispo and Santa Barbara counties was posted as SR 1, that section of the road known Route 56 (Las Cruces to Fernbridge). For Ventura, Los Angeles and Orange counties, Route 60 (San Juan Capistrano to the Oxnard area) became SR 3, and a few SR 3 signs were actually posted. The SR 3 signs were replaced by US 101 Alt. shields by 1936, as the road was built out; this change also allowed the extension of US 66 to end at another U.S. Route, in Santa Monica.

The gaps of non-state highway along the northern coast were finally filled in by the Legislature in 1951, though the State Department of Public Works was not required to maintain the newly added portions immediately. A connection from near Rockport to Legislative Route 1 (signed US 101) at Leggett was also added to the Legislative Route 56 definition, as the existing county road north from Rockport to Ferndale had not yet been paved.

The state Legislature in 1963 tossed out the old conflicting Legislative Route Numbers (1964 renumbering), got rid of some famous old U.S. routes, and renumbered many state highways. It abolished US 101A in Los Angeles, Orange and Ventura counties and renumbered it as SR 1. The Rockport to Leggett connection then became State Route 208. The cover of "California Highways" magazine in fall 1964 shows state engineers posting the new shield at Point Mugu. The same year, the Legislature by state law named SR 1 "Pacific Coast Highway" in Orange, Los Angeles and Ventura counties, "Cabrillo Highway" from Santa Barbara north to San Francisco, and "Shoreline Highway" from Marin County to its northern terminus. Many cities, however, did not change the name of city streets that are part of SR 1, such as Lincoln and Sepulveda boulevards in Los Angeles, Santa Monica and El Segundo; and Junipero Serra and Park Presidio boulevards in San Francisco. Several other cities and communities like Newport Beach and Bodega Bay merely named their respective city streets as "Coast Highway".

Modern alignments

The freeway portion of SR 1 from Highway 68 in Monterey to Munras Avenue opened in 1956–1960. The segment from Munras Avenue to the northern border of Sand City and Seaside opened in 1968, and bypasses the original highway alignment of Munras Avenue and Fremont Street in Monterey, and Fremont Boulevard through Seaside. North of Seaside, the freeway was built over the original SR 1 alignment through Fort Ord in 1973. North of Fort Ord, SR 1 now veers to the left of the original alignment and bypasses Marina to the west. This segment including the interchange with SR 156 and the short, 2-lane Castroville Bypass opened in 1976. Originally SR 1 followed the SR 156 alignment to the SR 183 intersection in Castroville, then turned northwest, following the present-day SR 183 through Castroville before rejoining its existing alignment at the northern terminus of the Castroville Bypass.

Plans to upgrade SR 1 to a freeway from its southern terminus all the way to Oxnard, including building an offshore causeway from the Santa Monica Pier to Topanga Canyon Boulevard south of Malibu, were ultimately killed by 1971 due to local opposition. In 1980, another section was added northwest of Ventura near Emma Wood State Beach, when several miles of the old two-lane alignment of U.S. Route 101 were posted as SR 1 where the freeway had bypassed it in about 1960. Then in 1988, the segment from Purisima Road in Lompoc to SR 135 was re-routed from Harris Grade Road to the former County Route S20 so it could directly serve Vandenberg Air Force Base.

Construction to bridge the gap in the Lost Coast region between Rockport and Ferndale was eventually abandoned. The steepness and related geotechnical challenges of the coastal mountains made this stretch of coastline too costly for highway builders to establish routes through the area. In 1984, SR 1 was then re-routed to replace State Highway 208, connecting Rockport and Leggett, while the segment between Ferndale and Fernbridge was renumbered as State Highway 211. Most of the coastline in the area is now part of Sinkyone Wilderness State Park and the King Range National Conservation Area.

The roadway along Devil's Slide, south of Pacifica, became the site of frequent deadly crashes and roadway-closing landslides. Beginning in 1958, Caltrans supported a plan to construct an inland bypass over Montara Mountain as an alternate route, but was eventually opposed by community and environmental groups who supported a tunnel instead. After decades of legal disputes, the Federal Highway Administration ordered Caltrans in 1995 to re-evaluate the proposed tunnel. Then on November 5, 1996, San Mateo County voters approved Measure T to change the county's official preference from the bypass to the tunnel. Ground eventually broke in 2005, and the Tom Lantos Tunnels opened in April 2013.

In 2014, two-way traffic was restored along the original PCH segment from Copper Lantern to Blue Lantern streets in the Dana Point city center after 25 years of one-way operation. During that period, only northbound traffic had flowed along this section of PCH while southbound traffic had been diverted onto the parallel Del Prado Avenue.

SR 1 has never been planned to extend south into San Diego, or north into Crescent City, where I-5 (which replaced the US 101 designation and signage between Los Angeles and San Diego) and US 101 serve as the coastal highways in those areas, respectively.

As a cycling venue

For the 1932 Summer Olympics, the segment of the SR 1 between Oxnard and Santa Monica (then known as the Theodore Roosevelt Highway) hosted part of the road cycling events. Portions of SR 1 have also hosted stages of the Tour of California.

Maintenance

Landslides
Frequent landslides and erosion along the coast have caused portions of SR 1 to either be closed for long periods of time, or be re-routed entirely. Some of these include:

 A segment along the coast between Pacifica and Daly City in what is now Thornton Beach was damaged and rendered unusable after a 5.3 magnitude earthquake on March 22, 1957. SR 1 was then eventually re-routed to turn inland to join Interstate 280.
 The Piedras Blancas Realignment Project plans to re-route the road up to  further inland to avoid the expected coastal erosion from the Piedras Blancas Light Station to the Arroyo de la Cruz Bridge in San Luis Obispo County.
Big Rock Mesa landslide in September 1983 in Malibu was one of the worst in state history. A total of 250 homes collapsed, cracked or slid off their foundation with 30 homes being condemned. The state agreed to pay forty million dollars as cutting through the hillside to build Pacific Coast Highway was a contributing cause.
 The Devil's Slide area has been prone to major landslides. One slide in 1995 caused the road to be closed for five months, while another in 2006 led to a four-month closure. The Tom Lantos Tunnels, named after former U.S. Congressman Tom Lantos, opened in 2013 to bypass the area.
This followed a four-month, $25 million reconstruction that repaired damage from a 2007 landslide.
 A March 2011 landslide in the Big Sur region forced Caltrans to close the highway for several months. A section south of Lucia that is also prone to frequent landslides, known as Pitkins Curve and Rain Rocks, was replaced with a bridge and a covered rock shed.
The road was closed or partially closed due to mudslides and landslides in at least six locations. On February 20, Caltrans declared that the Pfeiffer Canyon Bridge just south of Pfeiffer Big Sur State Park was damaged beyond repair, closing that segment of SR 1 for eight months, and effectively splitting Big Sur in half. Some businesses, cut off from customers and without access to supplies, were forced to close. For some residents, the only means of getting out was via helicopter. In March, Caltrans demolished the bridge and began construction of the replacement. The rebuilt bridge opened on October 13, 2017 at a cost of $24 million.
 Another major slide at Mud Creek closed a  stretch of the highway in May 2017. The slide was on a section of the road that was already closed due to smaller slides. The scale of the slide was compared to a very large slide during the winter of 1983–1984 that closed SR 1 for more than a year. A replacement roadway was built over the landslide and opened in July 2018, at a cost of $40 million.
 After heavy rainfall, a section of the highway at mile marker 30, near Rat Creek in Monterey County, collapsed into the ocean in January 2021.  It reopened in April 2021.

Future projects
In 2014, Caltrans relinquished the portion of SR 1 in Oxnard along Oxnard Boulevard. The plan is then for PCH between Pleasant Valley Road and US 101 to be re-routed from Oxnard Boulevard onto Rice Avenue. That segment of Rice Avenue includes a railroad grade crossing at 5th Avenue that was the site of the February 2015 Oxnard train derailment, which eventually led to one death and 29 injuries. This was the twelfth accident at the crossing in ten years. An overpass has been planned at that site for almost two decades, but funding has not been available in Ventura County for the estimated $35 million grade separation project.

In 2015, a $20 million project was proposed to add over 150 safety improvements to the stretch of the highway in Malibu. This follows a string of fatal accidents in the area, including one involving Caitlyn Jenner that claimed another person's life.
 
The Calera Parkway project proposes to widen the non-freeway segment in Pacifica between the Rockaway Beach and Vallemar districts, but faces opposition by local residents and environmentalists.

Major intersections

In popular culture
Tim Buckley's 1969 album Happy Sad includes a song with the title "Love from Room 109 at the Islander (On Pacific Coast Highway)".

In 2002, The Decemberists released a song titled "California One/Youth and Beauty Brigade" on their album Castaways and Cutouts.

In 2012, The Beach Boys released a song titled "Pacific Coast Highway". Described by critics as "introspective", "autumnal", and "hymnlike", the song takes the perspective of an aged person driving down the highway during sunset as he reflects on his advancing years in life, deciding that he is more comfortable living alone.

See also

References

External links

Route 1 highway conditions from Caltrans
Bay Area FasTrak – includes toll information on the Golden Gate Bridge and the other Bay Area toll facilities
State Route 1, California @ AARoads.com
Route 1 at California Highways
California's Highway 1, CNN-TravelGuide Pursuits
California's Pacific Coast Highway from National Geographic
Guide to California's Highway 1 at Travel + Leisure
California Highway 1 Attractions at USA Today
California's Highway 1, The Wine-Lovers' Route at Wine Enthusiast Magazine
1958 plans for the conversion of Junipero Serra Boulevard in San Francisco to freeway
1964 plans for the conversion of Park Presidio Boulevard in San Francisco to freeway
Ultimate California Highway 1 road trip at Sunset Magazine

 
001
All-American Roads
Big Sur
001
Monuments and memorials in California
Olympic cycling venues
State Route 001
State Route 001
State Route 001
State Route 001
State Route 001
State Route 001
State Route 001
State Route 001
State Route 001
State Route 001
State Route 001
State Route 001
001
001
001
U.S. Route 101
Venues of the 1932 Summer Olympics